Dries Helsloot (born 4 January 1937) is a retired cyclist from the Netherlands.
In 1967 he won a bronze medal at the UCI Motor-paced World Championships in his native Amsterdam. He won a national title in motor-paced racing in 1966 and finished in second place in 1967–1969.

References

1937 births
Living people
Dutch male cyclists
Cyclists from Amsterdam